Stenagostus is a genus of beetles belonging to the family Elateridae.

The species of this genus are found in Europe and Japan.

Species:
 Stenagostus horioi
 Stenagostus laufferi (Reitter, 1904)

References

Elateridae
Elateridae genera